A by-election was held for the New South Wales Legislative Assembly electorate of Northumberland on 12 February 1877 because Charles Stevens was insolvent. Stevens had left the colony on an expedition to recover valuable property, including 2,576 ounces of gold from the General Grant, which wrecked off Auckland Island.

Dates

Candidates
 Thomas Hungerford was a pastoralist and a former member for Upper Hunter however his election was overturned by the Election and Qualifications Committee and he was defeated in the resulting by-election.

 William Turner was a mining foreman at Wallsend. Members of parliament were unpaid at the time and Turner was supported by the local miners under the banner of the political reform league with funds raised by a subscription, said to be £ per person.

Result

Charles Stevens was insolvent.

See also
Electoral results for the district of Northumberland
List of New South Wales state by-elections

Notes

References

1877 elections in Australia
New South Wales state by-elections
1870s in New South Wales